G'day may refer to:

 g'day, a greeting in Australian English 
 G'day (album), a 1993 album by Trio Töykeät

See also
 G'day G'day (album), a 1988 album by Slim Dusty
 "G'day G'day" (song), the title song
 G-Day (disambiguation)